The Texas Company Filling Station, at 102 S. Williams St. in Victoria, Texas, was built in 1925.  It was listed on the National Register of Historic Places in 1986.

It was a filling station with two service bays.  When listed it was one of two pre-1935 service stations surviving in Victoria.

It has been demolished.

References

Gas stations on the National Register of Historic Places in Texas
National Register of Historic Places in Victoria County, Texas
Buildings and structures completed in 1925
Texaco